Philipp Prosenik (born 3 March 1993) is an Austrian professional footballer who plays as a forward for SC Himberg.

Club career
Born in Vienna, Prosenik started playing football with German 1860 Munich where his father was signed at that time. In 2001, he returned to Austria to continue his sport at local SV Schwechat, close to Vienna. Subsequently, he was signed by renowned Rapid Wien, before moving to the youth ranks of English Premier League side Chelsea in 2009. He signed for Italian Serie A club Milan in January 2012. He was released by Milan in July 2013. He returned to Rapid Wien in October 2013, at first only playing in the reserves team. Since the start of the 2014–15 he is also included in the first team's squad.

Prosenik joined SV Ried in January 2018.

Personal life
He is the son of former Austrian international footballer Christian Prosenik.

Career statistics

References

External links

Philipp Prosenik at ÖFB

1993 births
Living people
Austrian expatriate footballers
Austrian people of Slovenian descent
SK Rapid Wien players
TSV 1860 Munich players
SV Schwechat players
Chelsea F.C. players
Wolfsberger AC players
A.C. Milan players
SV Ried players
SV Mattersburg players
Floridsdorfer AC players
Expatriate footballers in Germany
Expatriate footballers in England
Expatriate footballers in Italy
Austrian expatriate sportspeople in Germany
Austrian expatriate sportspeople in England
Austrian expatriate sportspeople in Italy
Austrian footballers
Austria youth international footballers
Austria under-21 international footballers
Austrian Football Bundesliga players
2. Liga (Austria) players
Austrian Regionalliga players
Footballers from Vienna
Association football forwards